The 2017 Israeli Labor Party leadership election was held in July 2017. The first round of voting took place on 4 July. Since none of the candidates won at least 40 percent of the vote, a second round of voting took place in which the two candidates who won the most votes in the first round, Avi Gabbay and Amir Peretz, ran. The second round of voting took place on 10 July, with Avi Gabbay winning 52.2% of the vote.

Results

References

Israeli Labor Party leadership elections
2017 elections in Israel
July 2017 events in Asia
Israeli Labor Party leadership election